Maurice Gabolde (27 August 1891, Castres – 14 January 1972, Barcelona) was a French jurist and politician. During World War II, he served as  minister of Justice in the Vichy regime.

After the War he was sentenced to death by France for collaborationism; but had already escaped from  the Sigmaringen enclave to Spain before the fall of the Vichy government in exile.

References

1891 births
1972 deaths
People from Castres
French jurists
French Ministers of Justice
French collaborators with Nazi Germany
Right-wing politicians in France
French exiles
French emigrants to Spain
French politicians convicted of crimes
20th-century jurists